Kira Talent is a Canadian start-up company.  The company operates a cloud-based holistic admissions assessment platform designed for use by academic admissions departments to assess and enroll students. Organizations are able to create a customized assessment and record video questions, receive candidate responses, and evaluate the responses virtually within the platform. Presently, Kira Talent’s office is located in Toronto and the CEO is Emilie Cushman.

History
Kira Talent was founded in 2012 by Emilie Cushman and Konrad Listwan It was named the Most Outstanding Venture among the Next 36 (Canada’s Entrepreneurial Leadership Initiative) participants of 2012.  The Next 36 Program provided seed capital and mentorship.

Kira Talent's founder and CEO, Emilie Cushman, was named to the 2019 Forbes 30 Under 30 for Education.

Product 

Kira Talent’s cloud-based applicant assessment platform was introduced as an alternative to in-person and phone interviews.  The interviewer records their questions over video and sends them over to candidates with an established deadline.  After viewing each question, an interviewee has an allotted amount of time to think over the query, after which the webcam turns on and another specified time frame is given for a response. Questions can invite timed written or timed video responses. After applicants have responded the reviewers can log-in to see, rank, share, and compare the results.

In 2017, Kira introduced the ability to upload documents like resumes and written essays  as well as a number of admissions-specific review tools like rubrics and analytics.

In 2019, Kira Talent partnered with Turnitin to offer a plagiarism checker for college admissions.

The platform is GDPR and WCAG 2.0 AA compliant.

Publications & Speaking 

Kira Talent maintains a higher education blog and online newsletter, The Admissions Roundup, on higher education admissions and recruitment.

Notable publication releases include Breaking Down Bias in Admissions  Demystifying Holistic Admissions: The Comprehensive Guide to Holistic Review  and The Future of Admissions Assessment.

In 2018, Kira's team spoke on admissions and enrollment at the Ontario University Registrars' Association (OURA) Conference, the Graduate Management Admissions Council Annual Meeting, as well as the Council of Graduate Schools Annual Meeting. Kira Talent representatives also participated in a holistic admissions workshop at James Madison University.

Financing 

In October 2012, Kira Talent closed a seed capital investment round led by Relay Ventures and supported by 18 investors, including entrepreneur Tony Lacavera, business strategist Roger Martin and financier David Shaw.

In August 2016, Kira Talent raised a $5 million Series A.

Schools using Kira Talent 

Schools using Kira Talent include: 
 University of Toronto Rotman School of Management 
 University of Washington Foster School of Business 
 Washington University Olin Business School  
 Western University Ivey School of Business  
 University of South Wales 
 Boston University Questrom School of Business  
 Weatherhead School of Management at Case Western University  
 Johns Hopkins University Carey School of Business  
 UC Berkeley Haas School of Business
 Queen's University Smith School of Business  
 Kellogg School of Management at Northwestern University 
 Yale School of Management at Yale University 
 Ohio State University Fisher College of Business
 INSEAD
 London Business School
 Imperial College London
 University of Waterloo School of Engineering
 McMaster University Faculty of Engineering 
 Oxford Saïd Business School 
 The York School
 University of Connecticut School of Business

References

External links
Kira Talent: Product
Kira Talent: Customers

Canadian companies established in 2012
Companies based in Toronto
Educational technology companies of Canada
Software companies of Canada